Francisco Capiral San Diego (October 10, 1935 – August 26, 2015) was the Bishop-Emeritus of the Diocese of Pasig, a suffragan of the Archdiocese of Manila in the Metro Manila region of the Philippines.

Biography
Francisco Capiral San Diego was born October 10, 1935, at Lawa, Obando, Bulacan. He spent his elementary years at Obando Elementary School, and was a high school salutatorian at Western Colleges in Naic, Cavite. He underwent Special Latin Course at the Our Lady of Guadalupe Minor Seminary, then proceeded to San Carlos Seminary for his philosophical and theological studies. He was ordained to the priesthood December 21, 1963, by the Auxiliary Bishop of Manila, Hernando Antiporda.

San Diego was appointed the following year as parochial vicar of the present-day National Shrine of Our Lady of Guadalupe in Guadalupe Nuevo, Makati, after which in 1971, he succeeded as parish priest. He worked for the Metropolitan Matrimonial Tribunal of Manila from 1964 to 1983. From 1977 to 1979, he was vicar forane of the Our Lady of Guadalupe Vicariate. He obtained his Licentiate in Canon Law, cum laude, in 1979 from the Royal and Pontifical University of Santo Tomas, with his thesis entitled Those Who Practice Psychosexual Anomaly Cannot Contract A Valid Marriage. He spent some years teaching at San Carlos Seminary in Makati and Our Lady of the Angels Seminary in Novaliches, Quezon City, and was appointed Episcopal Vicar of the Ecclesiastical District of Makati. Fr. San Diego was named parish priest of San Felipe Neri Parish in Mandaluyong in 1981. That same year, he was named Monsignor with the dignity of Honorary Prelate by the late Pope John Paul II.

The late Apostolic Nuncio to the Philippines, Archbishop Bruno Torpigliani consecrated him as bishop August 10, 1983. He served as Coadjutor Apostolic Vicar of Palawan from 1983 to 1987, and apostolic vicar from 1987 to 1995. From 1983 to 1985, he served as pastor of St. Joseph Parish in Narra, Palawan. He too served as rector of Seminario de San Jose in Puerto Princesa City from 1985 to 1988.

He succeeded Pedro Bantigue of Laguna in 1995, becoming the second bishop of the Diocese of San Pablo. While serving the local church of Laguna, he built a new Bishop's Residence and Chancery Office in San Pablo City. Pope John Paul II appointed San Diego as first bishop of Pasig in 2003.

On December 21, 2010, Pope Benedict XVI finally accepted San Diego's retirement as Bishop of Pasig, in compliance with Canon 401, Paragraph 1 of the 1983 Code of Canon Law requiring bishops to submit their resignation upon reaching the mandatory age of 75. Gaudencio Cardinal Rosales, concurrently Archbishop of Manila, was named Apostolic Administrator of the diocese. The Pope named Mylo Hubert Claudio Vergara, bishop of San Jose in Nueva Ecija and a native of Pasig, as new bishop of Pasig, April 20, 2011. He died on August 26, 2015 due to cardiac arrest, two months before his 80th birthday.

See also

References

External links
Bishop Francisco San Diego (CBCP)
Francisco San Diego (Catholic Hierarchy)

20th-century Roman Catholic bishops in the Philippines
1935 births
2015 deaths
People from Bulacan
21st-century Roman Catholic bishops in the Philippines
Roman Catholic bishops of San Pablo
University of Santo Tomas alumni
Filipino bishops